is a Japanese manga series written and illustrated by Yasuki Tanaka. It was serialized on Shueisha's digital magazine Shōnen Jump+ from October 2017 to February 2021. An anime television series adaptation by OLM aired from April to September 2022. A live-action film, a real escape game, and a video game have also been announced.

Synopsis
Following the death of his parents, Shinpei Ajiro grew up with the Kofune sisters Ushio and Mio before heading to Tokyo to live alone. Two years later, he returns to his hometown of Hitogashima Island, Wakayama Prefecture to attend Ushio's funeral following news of her drowning. However, Shinpei becomes suspicious when he receives news of strangle marks around Ushio's neck, implying that she was murdered intentionally. Now haunted by her "ghost" and assisted by Mio, Shinpei tries to find the answers to what really happened to Ushio and possibly save the residents from a strange dark enigma.

Characters

Shinpei is a kind-hearted teenager who used to live on Hitogashima with the Kofune family after his parents' death, but moved away to Tokyo to become independent soon after. Returning to attend Ushio's funeral leads him down a path of dark secrets on the island. He discovers his ability to loop by dying.

Mio's older sister and Shinpei's adoptive sister. Unlike Mio, Ushio is bold, brazen and hot-tempered, though this makes her capable of acting quickly and responding to sudden situations. She is often seen wearing a school swimsuit.

Ushio's little sister who has a crush on Shinpei. Unlike Ushio, Mio is shy and meek, and it is these personality and physical differences that have led Mio to harbour much self-hatred. She has a Shadow version; whereas the Shadow version wears white panties, Mio wears striped panties.
 / 

A horror-mystery writer, Hizuru is intelligent and level-headed, capable of making accurate deductions and detailed planning. She is also a trained combatwoman and this skill is compounded by how the data of her younger twin brother, Ryūnosuke's, Shadow exists in her, allowing her to detect Shadows and move at their speed albeit with much strain on her body. 

Shinpei's best friend on the island who is in love with Mio. He is the oldest child of the Hishigata family, who runs the Hishigata Clinic on the island. Sō is soft-hearted, passionate and cares deeply about human life, wanting to be a doctor to save people. He joins Shinpei in the fight against the Shadows.

Sō's reserved little sister and Mio's close friend. 

An elderly hunter on the island and ally of Hizuru against the growing conflict on the island. Like Hizuru, he is skilled with the use of firearms, specifically with him being a talented sniper. 
 / 

The local priest and one of Hizuru's childhood friends. In reality, he is the founder of the Hishigata clan from centuries ago, the first shadow Haine has ever created and procreated with, making him a human–shadow hybrid.

The suspicious young daughter of the Kobayakawa family whom Ushio saved from drowning.  

The goddess of the island, Hiruko-sama, and the mother of all Shadows, who takes on the appearance of a young girl. 

Hizuru's younger twin brother who was murdered by Haine 14 years ago. When Haine tried to scan a shadow for Ryunosuke, she went berserk and a chunk of his shadow went to Hizuru, causing him to inhabit his older sister's body as a second personality as the fighter of the group and manifests whenever needed.

The local and only police officer on the island, the sleazy Totsumura is also a relative of the Kofune family.

Sō and Tokiko's father, the local doctor and coroner. 

Ushio and Mio's father, as well as Shinpei's adoptive father.

Media

Manga
The series was also simultaneously published on the app and website Manga Plus. Shueisha collected its chapters in thirteen individual tankōbon volumes, released from February 2, 2018, to April 2, 2021.

In North America, the manga was licensed for English release by Udon Entertainment. They released the series in a in a six-volume paperback omnibus edition from June 1 to September 6, 2022. They also announced a simultaneous hardcover edition; however, it was delayed, and the first volume was released on December 20, 2022.

A two-part spin-off, titled , was published on Shōnen Jump+ on April 14–15, 2022. It was published in English on Manga Plus. Shueisha released the collected volume on July 4, 2022.

Volume list

Japanese release

English release

Anime

An anime adaptation was announced at the end of the series' 139th and final chapter in February 2021. It was later confirmed to be a 25-episode television series. The series was produced by OLM and directed by Ayumu Watanabe, with Hiroshi Seko overseeing the series' scripts, Miki Matsumoto designing the characters, and Kusanagi handling the art. Keiichi Okabe, Ryuichi Takada, and Keigo Hoashi composed the music at MONACA. It aired from April 15 to September 30, 2022, on Tokyo MX, BS11, and Kansai TV.

Disney Platform Distribution licensed the anime. The international release dates vary between regions, starting from May 4, 2022, in Indonesia, Malaysia, and Thailand; June 1, 2022 in Australia, Hong Kong, New Zealand, Singapore and Taiwan; July 20, 2022 in South Korea; and on October 19, 2022, in India via Disney+ Hotstar. On January 11, 2023, Udon Entertainment announced via Twitter that the series became available on Hulu in the United States.

Video game
A visual novel, titled  was announced by Mages in July 2022. The game retells the events of the anime, and also follows six original stories, with an original ending. In addition to the characters in the series, the game also features an original character designed by the series' author Yasuki Tanaka, named Kaori Koyuba (voiced by Yui Ogura). The cast members from the anime reprised their roles in the game. It was released for PlayStation 4 and Nintendo Switch in Japan on January 26, 2023. The limited edition of the game includes an official guidebook and an original soundtrack CD.

Live-action
A live-action adaptation was announced at the end of the series' 139th and final chapter in February 2021.

Real escape game
A real escape game was announced at the end of the series' 139th and final chapter in February 2021.

Reception
Kōhei Horikoshi, My Hero Academias author and Tanaka's ex-assistant, made positive comments about the series.

In a review of the first volume, Erica Friedman, writing for Anime News Network called the series a "can't-put-down kind of read", praising its art and story, adding as well that it has a "nice balance between the people, the setting, the action, and the horror." Friedman, however, criticized its fanservice, stating that "[it] can be distracting".

Notes

References

External links
 
 

2022 anime television series debuts
Anime and manga about time travel
Anime series based on manga
Hulu original programming
Japanese webcomics
Mystery anime and manga
OLM, Inc.
Shōnen manga
Shueisha manga
Supernatural anime and manga
Suspense anime and manga
Tokyo MX original programming
Webcomics in print